This is a list of official birds of United States counties and county-level governments organized by state.

California
 Lake County, California - great blue heron, Ardea herodias (unofficial)
 San Francisco County, California - California quail, Callipepla californica

Maryland
 Howard County, Maryland - American goldfinch, Carduelis tristis
 Montgomery County, Maryland - American robin, Turdus migratorius
 Prince George's County, Maryland - eastern bluebird, Sialia sialis

New York
Nassau County, New York - osprey, Pandion haliaetus
Westchester County, New York - blue jay, Cyanocitta cristata

See also
List of national birds
List of U.S. state birds
List of official city birds

Notes
1.The city and county of San Francisco are a single government, so the city bird is a county bird.

References